Dizaj (also Romanized as Dīzaj) is a village in Margavar Rural District of Silvaneh District of Urmia County, West Azerbaijan province, Iran. At the 2006 National Census, its population was 3,440 in 634 households. The following census in 2011 counted 3,952 people in 976 households. The latest census in 2016 showed a population of 4,907 people in 1,266 households; it was the largest village in its rural district.

References 

Urmia County

Populated places in West Azerbaijan Province

Populated places in Urmia County